GSE Systems, Inc. develops and markets software-based simulation and training products to nuclear, oil, and gas electricity generators, and the chemical process industries. It also sells software for monitoring and optimizing plant and signal analysis to the power industry.

GSE Systems was established in 1994 from three simulation companies that came together.  They were part of an original heritage from  Singer-Link where they were involved in high-intensity simulation applications such as flight simulators.  Since 1994 the company has grown through acquisitions.  The primary businesses continue to be process control focused in the chemical, pharmaceutical and food industry, and simulation, which is also focused on fossil and nuclear simulation.

GSE Systems is headquartered in suburban Baltimore, Maryland. Global operations are conducted from offices in Sykesville (Maryland), Nyköping (Sweden), Beijing (China), Stockton-on-Tees (UK), and Chennai (India).

Timeline:

1929 Edwin Albert Link invents and patents the first Link Trainer, forms Link Aeronautical Corporation in Binghamton, NY.

1930 Link Flying School organized in Binghamton.

1933 Link Aeronautical Corporation moves to Endicott, NY to maintain the flight school, repair airplanes, and operate charter flights.

1934 Link Aeronautical Corporation returns to Binghamton.

1935 Link Aviation Devices, Inc. is formed in Binghamton, NY to manufacture trainers etc. Link Aviation Devices, Inc. renamed Link Aviation, Inc.

1937 Link Manufacturing Company Limited is formed in Gananoque, Ontario to build
trainers for Canadian and UK customers.

1953 Ed Link steps down as president of Link Aviation.

1954 Ed and George Link sell Link Aviation to General Precision Equipment Corporation.

1956 Link Aviation acquires a controlling interest in Air Trainers Limited of England and changes its name to Air Trainers Link Limited.

1959 Ownership of Air Trainers Link Limited is transferred to the parent company, GPE, and the name changes to General Precision Systems Ltd.

1965 GPE buys the operations of the Riverdale, MD plant of Electronics Division of ACF Industries (previously ERCO) and moves it to Silver Spring, MD.

1967 Redifon, a member of Rediffusion, buys Air Trainers Link Ltd. and renames it Redifon Air Trainers Ltd.

1968 Singer Corporation acquires GPE. Edwin Link remains as consultant until 1972.

1984 Simuflite Training International Inc. is founded by Singer.

1987 Singer’s Link Division is incorporated as Link Corporation.

1988 Paul A. Bilzerian buys Singer Corporation.

1988 CAE Industries, Ltd. buys Link Corporation of Silver Spring, MD.

1988 Singer’s simulation manufacturing business is reorganized under the name of LinkMiles with two companies: Link-Miles Limited located in Lancing, England and LinkMiles International Simulation Corporation based in Binghamton, NY.

1989 Singer is renamed Bicoastal Corporation.

1989 Bicoastal Corporation files Chapter 11 bankruptcy.

1990 Link-Miles Simulation Corporation of Columbia, MD is renamed S3 Technologies.

1990 Thomson-CSF of France buys Link-Miles Limited, merges it with Redifussion Simulation, and renames it Thomson Training & Simulation.

1992 Bicoastal Corporation is dissolved.

1993 ManTech International buys S3 Technologies.

1995 Hughes Electronics Corporation buys CAE-Link.

1994 GSE Systems (Global Simulation & Engineering Systems) absorbs S3 Technologies.

Major Milestones:

In 2011, Construction of Westinghouse AP1000 nuclear power plant simulator, a first-of-a-kind project. The simulators were built for Sanmen Nuclear Power Station and Haiyang Nuclear Power Plant in China, also Vogtle Electric Generating Plant and Virgil C. Summer Nuclear Generating Station in US.

In 1977, GSE was a pioneer provider of high-fidelity refinery and fossil power plant simulators. Since then, GSE has built more full-scope simulators than all of its competitors combined.

In 1971, GSE Systems, then Singer-Link Simulation, built one of the early stage commercial full-scope nuclear power plant simulators.  During 1968-1973 period there were four simulators commissioned by nuclear steam supply system (NSSS) vendors, which were General Electric, Westinghouse, Babcock & Wilcox, and Combustion Engineering. The later two were built by Singer-Link. The first utility-owned simulator was manufactured by Singer-Link for the Consolidated Edison Company in Buchanan, N.Y., which represented Indian Point 2, was ready for training in 1975.

Major Acquisitions:

GSE Systems Acquires EnVision Systems in the year 2011. EnVision, which provides interactive multi-media tutorials and simulation models, primarily to the petrochemical and oil & gas refining industries.  EnVision, with headquarters in Madison, NJ and an office in Chennai, India, was founded in 1991. EnVision’s tutorials and simulation models serve the rapidly growing entry-level training market for the oil & gas refining and specialty chemicals industries. EnVision’s products provide a foundation in process fundamentals and plant operations and interaction. With this knowledge base, users may then graduate to the full-scope, high-fidelity, real-time simulators provided by GSE. EnVision has completed more than 750 installations in over 28 countries and its approximately 130 clients include Shell Oil Company, BP, Total and Chevron.

References

External links
Official website
WSAT Dynamic Simulator

Companies listed on the Nasdaq
Companies established in 1994
Software companies based in Maryland
Software companies of the United States